Prussianism comprises the practices and doctrines of the Prussians, specifically the militarism and the severe discipline traditionally associated with the Prussian ruling class.

History 

Prussianism had its origins with the rise to the throne of Frederick William I in 1713, who laid the foundations for a professional and stable army; a legacy that was continued by his son Frederick II the Great, who formed an organized and effective army, and later by the latter's nephew Frederick William II.

Prussianism was based on the conservative militaristic caste of the Prussian Junkers, having as a fundamental basis a vertical, centralized, paternalistic and iron discipline. Its ideological underpinning consisted of a combination of the markedly aristocratic, warmongering, and expansionist nationalist ideology, traditionalism, conservatism, and militarism of the time. It was this philosophy that largely influenced the attitude of Prussia and later Germany in historical processes such as the Napoleonic Wars, the unification of Germany, the First World War, and the Second World War.

Sociologically, in addition, Prussianism was expressed in the so-called "Prussian virtues," influencing various relevant aspects of German culture.

Among the most important theorists and exponents of Prussianism are Karl von Clausewitz, Otto von Bismarck, and Oswald Spengler. On the other hand, several analysts consider that Prussianism had a significant influence on National Socialism. Furthermore, Prussianism is still visible in the current ideologies prevalent in Turkey.

Prussianism also had an influence in South America, during the 1920s, 1930s, and 1940s, especially in the military circles of Chile, Argentina, Colombia, and Bolivia. In Chile, relations with Prussia date back to the end of the 19th century when a German mission, under the command of Emil Körner, began the process of modernization and professionalization of the Chilean Army. These contacts were maintained and intensified during the first half of the 20th century, during which there was a process of "Prussianization" of Chile's military officers, NCO's and soldiers, even influencing the other armed forces branches, the Chilean Navy and Chilean Air Force, this can be seen during the Great Military Parade of Chile. In Argentina and Bolivia the Prussian model was also used as the basis for military professionalization in those years.

See also 
 Prussian virtues
 Preussentum und Sozialismus
 Pan-Germanism
 Protestant work ethic
 Imperial German influence on Republican Chile

References

External links 

 The Peril of Prussianism by Douglas Wilson Johnson

German culture
German nationalism
Political terminology in Germany
Prussia
Militarism